Pride of Le Havre may refer:

  in service under this name 1989–1994; formerly Viking Valiant; later Pride of Cherbourg, Pride of Al Salam 1, Mogador
  in service under this name 1994–2005; formerly Olau Hollandia; later SNAV Sardegna

Ship names